Lake Flagstaff, sometimes referred to as Flagstaff Lake  is an ephemeral salt lake located in the Great Southern region of Western Australia, approximately  north west of Woodanilling and  south west of Wagin.

Description
When they overflow waters discharge into the poorly described eastern branch of the Beaufort River. The same channel that usually provides inflow also flows away from the lakes at the same time when the lake is full (as occurs at Lake Ewlyamartup).

The lake is part of a series of swamps' lakes and large floodplain in the middle of the Beaufort river catchment and Blackwood River basin. The features of the landscape include alluvial plains,
small lunettes, dunes and swales on alluvial and aeolian deposits. The lake is situated along a major ancient drainage line. The northern shore of the lake is part of a crown reserve with an area of  designated for the protection of native fauna and flora.

History
The traditional owners of the area are the Noongar peoples who have inhabited the region for tens of thousands of years.

The lakes area was pioneered by the Douglas family. Joe Douglas and his five sons all selected land there in the 1890s, building homesteads and farming.

See also

References

Lakes of the Great Southern (Western Australia)
Saline lakes of Western Australia